Celaenorrhinus munda, also known as the Himalayan spotted flat, is a species of hesperiid butterfly found in South Asia.

Range
The butterfly occurs in India, Pakistan and Myanmar. It ranges from Simla in Himachal Pradesh, India, to Pakistan, and eastwards to the southern Shan states in Myanmar.

Status
William Harry Evans described this species as rare in 1932.

See also
Hesperiidae
List of butterflies of India (Hesperiidae)

References

External links

Print

Online

munda
Fauna of Pakistan
Butterflies of Asia
Butterflies of Indochina